High-speed rail service commenced in Poland on 14 December 2014, with the introduction of 20 non-tilting Pendolino trainsets operating on 4 designated lines radiating out from Warsaw. Polish State Railways started passenger service trains PKP Pendolino operating a speed 200 km/h on 80 km line Olszamowice-Zawiercie (part of railway line called CMK, from Warsaw to Katowice/Kraków). From December 2017 there are two 200 km/h sections, 136 km long in total. Polish state railways PKP launched the high-speed service under the Express Intercity Premium (EIP) brand name.

Current connections 

PKP Intercity was initially using only nine sets a day to operate 23 EIP services from Warsaw to Gdynia, Kraków, Katowice, and Wrocław. Today most of the 20 units operate on the core Kraków - Warsaw - Gdańsk - Gdynia route, running hourly at peak times and every 2 h off-peak. The (Gliwice/Bielsko-Biała - Katowice - Warsaw - Gdańsk - Gdynia route is operated five times a day. There are two Pendolinos each way per day on the Wrocław route. Headline journey times are 2 h 58 min from Warsaw to Gdańsk, 2 h 28 min to Kraków and 2 h 34 min to Katowice. EIP services from Warsaw to Wrocław run via the CMK trunk line, Częstochowa and Opole, taking 3 h 42 min against up to 6 h for the previous route via Poznań.

In addition to the Central Rail Line from Warsaw to Kraków and Katowice, and from Warsaw to Wrocław, the Pendolinos also operate on the 350 km (221 miles) route from Warsaw to Gdańsk and Gdynia on the Baltic Sea. When Pendolino services started on 14 December 2014 the previous Warsaw-Gdańsk rail travel time of 4½ to 6 hours was reduced to 2 hours 58 minutes by Pendolino, and will be reduced further to 2 hours 40 minutes when upgrading is completed.

Several sections of the Central Trunk Line currently permit speeds of 200 km/h (with a current speed record in Poland of 293 km/h) however only 160 km/h was used in commercial service. Polish Railways planned to buy Pendolino trains in 1998 but the contract was cancelled in the following year by the Supreme Control Chamber due to financial losses by Polish Railways.

Proposals 
Historically, there have been many proposals and plans put in place by several Polish governments and/or interest groups seeking to introduce high-speed rail to Poland. As of December 2009, Poland had 700-800 km of railways suited for rail transport reaching 160 km/h.

Centralny Port Komunikacyjny (CPK) 
In 2019, prime minister Mateusz Morawiecki announced detailed plans for Centralny Port Komunikacyjny (CPK), a megaproject with two main components: a new international airport between Warsaw and Łódź and a new nationwide high-speed railway network. This network will consist of ten major corridors radiating from the airport towards all regions of Poland, with approximately 2000 km of new high-speed-rail lines and 3700 km of modernized railway lines. The new lines will be designed for speeds of up to 350 km/h, with operational speeds of up to 250 km/h. The aim of the project is to provide fast connections between the largest urban areas in Poland and neighboring countries, with the railway station at the new CPK Airport serving as the central transport hub. Most major Polish cities (apart from Szczecin) will have a travel time to the airport of 2.5 hours or less. Connections will be extended to cities which were not collected by railway before the CPK program, such as Jastrzębie-Zdrój and Tomaszów Lubelski.

The CPK program will include international connections to the planned high-speed rail network in the Czech Republic (Katowice - Ostrava and Wałbrzych - Hradec Králové) and to Lithuania, Latvia and Estonia via Rail Baltica (Suwałki - Kaunas). This will enable travel time reductions such as Warsaw to Prague from 510 to 270 minutes and Warsaw to Kaunas from 480 to 210 minutes. The connection between Katowice and Ostrava will benefit from joint investments from the countries of the Visegrad group with the aim to link Warsaw, Brno, Bratislava and Budapest by high-speed rail.

The CPK program is planned to be implemented by 2040. Ten railway "spokes" will radiate from the CPK airport in different directions. Each spoke will consist of newly built sections and of modernized parts of the existing infrastructure. The main railway elements of the CPK program are broken down into the following spokes:

 Spoke No. 1
 CPK - Płock - Włocławek - Grudziądz - Tczew - Tricity - Lębork - Słupsk
 Włocławek - Toruń - Bydgoszcz - Piła - Szczecinek - Białogard - Kołobrzeg
 Spoke No. 2
 CPK - Warsaw - Nasielsk - Ciechanów - Działdowo - Olsztyn
 Spoke No. 3
 CPL - Warsaw - Zielonka - Tłuszcz - Czyżew - Białystok - Kuźnica
 Białystok - Ełk - Suwałki - Trakiszki
 Tłuszcz - Ostrołęka - Łomża - Pisz - Orzysz - Giżycko
 Spoke No. 4
 CPK - Warsaw - Siedlce - Łuków - Biała Podlaska - Terespol
 Spoke No. 5
 CPK - Warsaw - Otwock - Lublin - Trawniki - Chełm
 Trawniki - Krasnystaw -- Zamość - Tomaszów Lubelski - Bełżec (- Lviv)
 Spoke No. 6
 CPK - Grójec - Warka - Radom - Iłża - Ostrowiec Świętokrzyski - Stalowa Wola - Łętownia - Rzeszów - Sanok
 Rzeszów - Jasło - Krosno
 Spoke No. 7
 CPK - Central Rail Line (Centralna Magistrala Kolejowa or CMK) - new Lesser Poland and Silesia Hub (Węzeł Małopolsko-Śląski or WMŚ) - Kraków - Podłęże - Nowy Sącz/Chabówka
 WMŚ - Czechowicz-Dziedzice - Jastrzębie Zdrój
 WMŚ - Katowice
 CMK - Opoczno - Końskie -Kielce - Busko Zdrój - Tarnów - Nowy Sącz - Muszyna
 Spoke No. 8
 CPK - Skierniewice - Częstochowa - Opole - Nysa - Kłodzko
 Spoke No. 9
 CPK - Łódź - Sieradz - Wieruszów - Wrocław - Świdnica - Wałbrzych - Lubawka
 Sieradz - Kalisz - Poznań - Szczecin - Szczecin Goleniów
 Kalisz - Ostrów Wielkopolski - Leszno - Głogów - Zielona Góra
 Poznań - Zbąszynek - Gorzów Wielkopolski
 Spoke No. 10
 CPK - Warsaw - Sochaczew - Kutno - Konin - Swarzędz - Poznań

Warsaw to Poznań and Wrocław via Łódź 
Before the CPK program, plans had been made for a "Y" line that would have connected Warsaw-Łódź-Kalisz.  The line would then have split into two branches to Wrocław and Poznań.  The geometric layout of the line was planned to permit speeds of 360 km/h. Construction had been planned to begin around 2014 and finish in 2019. In April 2010, the tender for a feasibility study was awarded to a consortium led by Spanish company Ingenieria IDOM.  The feasibility study was granted €80 million in subsidy from the European Union.  The total cost of the line including construction and train sets was estimated at €6.9 billion and was planned to be partially financed by EU subsidies.

In the center of the city of Łódź the "Y" line would have traveled through a tunnel which would have linked two existing railway stations. One of them: Łódź Fabryczna would have been reconstructed as an underground station (construction contract was signed on 18 August 2011).  However, the "Y" line project was cancelled in 2011 due to insufficient funding. 
However, the central hub of "Y" line (the Łódź Fabryczna underground station) was completed.

As part of the CPK program, new railway lines similar to those proposed in the "Y" line project were announced. The new line will link Warsaw and Łódź via the new CPK Airport. The travel time between Warsaw and Łódź will be reduced from 100 to 45 minutes (with travel times to the airport of 15 and 30 minutes, respectively). Preparatory construction works are scheduled to start at the end of 2023, while the main construction works should start in 2024. In Łódź, trains will stop at Łódź Fabryczna station and continue on to Łódź Kaliska station via a newly constructed tunnel, similarly to previously cancelled plans. Further connections from Łódź via two branches starting in Sieradz to Wrocław and Poznań will reduce travel times from Łódź to Wrocław down from 180 to 60 minutes and from Łódź to Poznań down from 200 to 65 minutes.

Warsaw to Kyiv and Lviv 
In early February 2022, upon returning from a visit to Poland, Infrastructure Minister Oleksandr Kubrakov, his deputy Mustafa Nayyem and Ukrzaliznytsia CEO Oleksandr Kamyshin announced that Poland and Ukraine had agreed that a high-speed rail link would be built between Warsaw and Kyiv through , reducing travel times by four hours. Ukrzaliznytsia also decided to remove all restrictions on rail transit to Poland beginning on 10 February 2022. After the 2022 Russian invasion of Ukraine caused a lot of damage to Ukrainian railway and airport infrastructure, the Polish government in October 2022 offered to Ukraine help post-war reconstruction, as well as adding an extra high-speed rail link between Lublin and Lviv through Zamość and Bełżec (Spoke No. 5).

Upgraded lines
The Central Rail Line (CMK) Warsaw - Kraków/Katowice was originally built in 1977 to geometry appropriate for speeds up to 250 km/h, and only requires suitable signalling equipment to be fitted and some amount of modernisation works. ETCS Level 1 allowed trains to reach 200 km/h in 2014 on part of the line and a further upgrade for 250 km/h is planned.

Reconstruction work has started on the Warsaw-Gdynia (Sopot and Gdańsk) line to allow speeds up to 200 km/h for tilting trains. This initially allows trains to run to ETCS Level 1 standards with a commitment but no timetable for further upgrades to ETCS Level 2 standards. In the day of 13 December 2020 the speed limit was raised to 200 km/h on the line from Warsaw to seaport Gdynia by New Pendolino train.

Rolling stock

The seven-car Class ED250 trainsets have been supplied by Alstom Transport. Each set has seats for 57 first class and 345 second class passengers, with a buffet/bar and three four-seat business or family compartments.

Polish state railways PKP originally ordered 14 Pendolinos in 1998, but the order was cancelled in 2000 due to a shortage of funds.

In 2010 Alstom won a PKP Intercity tender for high-speed trains with an offer of 20 New Pendolino trains. Similarly to the CRH5, these are non-tilting.

On 30 May 2011 the Polish state railways PKP signed an agreement with Alstom for 20 Pendolinos ETR 610 for delivery in 2014. The first Pendolino was delivered on August 12, 2013. The Pendolinos were to operate on the high-speed CMK Central Rail Line from Kraków/Katowice to Warsaw, and on the routes from Gdynia to Warsaw and from Wrocław to Warsaw.

High-speed tests using the new Pendolino ED250 on the CMK Central Rail Line began in November 2013. On the first day of tests, November 16, the Pendolino reached . On 24 November 2013 the final day of tests on the CMK Central Rail Line the Pendolino reached .

Dispute between Alstom and Polish Railways PKP 
The contract between the Polish operator PKP Intercity and Alstom called for the first eight Pendolino ED250 trainsets to be delivered on 6 May 2014, tested ('homologated') for operation at   using European Train Control System Level 2 signalling. The tests had not been performed by May, and PKP announced that Alstom had failed to meet the contract terms and would be charged penalties as of May 6.  Alstom responded that homologation in Poland at 250 km/h using ETCS Level 2 was impossible, since ETCS Level 2 was not operational anywhere in Poland, and the Central Rail Line (Poland) where the first ED250 Pendolino had reached 293 km/h in testing was equipped with ETCS Level 1, not Level 2. On 26 June 2014 a compromise was reached between PKP and Alstom under which the Pendolinos would be delivered under a two-stage homologation, first homologated for operation using ETCS Level 1 and eventually to be homologated for ETCS Level 2. Pendolinos were put in service on 14 December 2014.

Operational status 
Other loco-hauled services branded EIC (Express InterCity) will be switched to EIP (Express Intercity Premium) operation over the coming months, with the eventual plan envisaging 17 Pendolinos in traffic, one spare and two for maintenance. All 20 trains have now been completed, with the final set being delivered to Poland at the beginning of December. However, the first unit which was used for testing and commissioning has been returned to Savigliano for retrofitting before entering revenue service.

As well as 3 kV DC for operation in Poland, the Pendolinos are equipped with 15 kV 16⅔ Hz and 25 kV 50 Hz and the train control systems needed to run in Germany, Austria and the Czech Republic. However, certification for international operation is not seen as a priority, as the trains are restricted to domestic services for an initial 10 years under the terms of a grant from the EU Cohesion Fund which covered 22% of the project cost.

Alstom expects to employ around 130 people at the Grochów maintenance depot, which has three covered tracks for servicing and two for maintenance. The company is using its TrainTracer health monitoring and diagnostics systems to manage the fleet, ensuring that sufficient trainsets are available for the operator. Some sets are stabled overnight at the outer termini, and cycled through the depot as required. The fleet management and pit-stop maintenance regime has been developed using experience in maintaining the Virgin Trains West Coast Class 390 Pendolino fleet in the United Kingdom, with many staff being trained in Manchester.

References

See also
Rail transport in Poland
Transport in Poland

 
Rail transport in Poland